Mikado station is a railway station in Mikado, Saskatchewan, Canada.  Mikado is part of the rural municipality of Sliding Hills.  The station serves as a flag stop for Via Rail's Winnipeg–Churchill train.

Footnotes

External links 
Via Rail Station Information

Sliding Hills No. 273, Saskatchewan
Via Rail stations in Saskatchewan